The Final Game or Olympics is a 2022 Spanish-Andorran sports drama film directed by Àlex Murrull and Dani de la Orden from a screenplay by Carlos Franco which stars Álvaro Cervantes and Jaime Lorente as Manel Estiarte and Pedro García Aguado. It is a dramatization of the Spain men's national water polo team's run at the 1992 Summer Olympics in Barcelona.

Plot 
The plot is a dramatization of the Spain men's national water polo team's run at the 1992 Summer Olympics in Barcelona, delving into the personal stories of Pedro García Aguado (and his substance addiction) and Manel Estiarte (coping with the tragedy of his sister's suicide). Despite opposing personalities, they end up reaching an understanding built upon the shared suffering under coach Matutinović, characterised by inhuman training methods that earned the latter the team's animosity.

Cast

Production 
The screenplay was penned by Carlos Franco. A Spanish-Andorran co-production, the film was produced by Playtime Movies and Sábado Películas alongside Imminent Produccions, with the participation of RTVE and collaboration from ICEC and Govern d'Andorra. Filming had already wrapped in November 2021. Shooting locations included Barcelona and Andorra.

Release 
Distributed by Universal Pictures International Spain, the film was theatrically released in Spain on 2 September 2022.

Reception 
David Pardillos of Cinemanía rated the film 3½ out 5 stars, considering that the helmers "manage to maintain the tension until the last second and demonstrate that sometimes great stories also emerge from defeats".

Fausto Fernández of Fotogramas rated the film 3 out of 5 stars, welcoming the delivery of a Spanish-cinema equivalent to Hoosiers whilst citing "certain digital tweaks" as a negative point.

Ekaitz Ortega of HobbyConsolas rated the film 63 out of 100 points ("acceptable"), considering that even if Olympics suffers from a certain standardization in the way the story is told, it is a sincere film that entertains throughout, highlighting the work by Lorente and Cervantes and the adaptation of the historical context.

Manuel J. Lombardo of Diario de Sevilla rated the film 2 out of 5 stars, deeming it to be "a film of basic values and soaked testosterone that is only missing a touch of locker-room homoeroticism to be a true product of its time".

See also 
 List of Spanish films of 2022

References 

2022 films
2022 biographical drama films
2020s sports drama films
Spanish biographical drama films
Spanish sports drama films
2020s Spanish-language films
Films shot in Barcelona
Films shot in Andorra
Films set in Andorra
Films set in Barcelona
Films set in 1992
Films about the 1992 Summer Olympics
Andorran drama films
Biographical films about sportspeople
Drama films based on actual events
Sports films based on actual events
2022 drama films
2020s Spanish films